Desnivel is Spain's first monthly independent climbing and mountaineering magazine, published since 1981.

History and profile
Desnivel was founded in 1981 by Spanish mountaineer and journalist Darío Rodríguez. Under the leadership of Rodríguez the magazine became very influential in Spanish climbing circles. 

The magazine is published monthly in Madrid and is focused on mountaineering (Pyrenees, Alps, expeditions) and climbing (Iberian Peninsula). Today the Editorial Desnivel is publishing mountaineering books and three magazines: Desnivel (mountaineering/climbing), Escalar (sport climbing) and Grandes Espacios (outdoor).

See also 
 Rock & Ice
 Climbing magazine
 American Alpine Journal

References

External links
 Desnivel website
 Interview with Dario Rodriguez (2008).

1981 establishments in Spain
Climbing magazines
Magazines established in 1981
Magazines published in Madrid
Monthly magazines published in Spain
Spanish-language magazines
Spanish-language websites